Camptomastix is a genus of moths of the family Crambidae.

Species
Camptomastix hisbonalis (Walker, 1859)
Camptomastix septentrionalis Inoue, 1982

References

Spilomelinae
Crambidae genera
Taxa named by William Warren (entomologist)